Wamsley Creek is a stream in Daviess and DeKalb Counties in the U.S. state of Missouri.

Wamsley Creek was named after H. and I. C. Wamsley, the original owners of the site.

See also
List of rivers of Missouri

References

Rivers of Daviess County, Missouri
Rivers of DeKalb County, Missouri
Rivers of Missouri